Rob Lynch, is the eponymously-titled five-track EP from singer-songwriter Rob Lynch. It is Lynch's first release not to be released under the moniker Lost On Campus. It has been nicknamed "The East EP" by fans.

Track listing

Band members
 Rob Lynch – vocals/guitar
 Julian Bowen – extra instrumentation/additional vocals
 Hero Baldwin – additional vocals
 Alex Rumble – additional vocals

References

2011 EPs
Walnut Tree Records EPs